SERS can mean:
Selective En bloc Redevelopment Scheme, a housing strategy in Singapore.
Surface enhanced Raman spectroscopy or surface-enhanced Raman scattering

See also
 Sers (disambiguation)